"Tonight Belongs to U!" is a song by American singer Jeremih. It features American rapper Flo Rida, and was released as a standalone single prior to his third studio album Late Nights. The track premiered on April 6, 2015.

Remixes
On June 4, 2015, Dutch DJ Afrojack released a remix of the track.

Performances
Jeremih performed the song with Flo Rida on The Tonight Show Starring Jimmy Fallon July 22, 2015.

Charts

Weekly charts

Year-end charts

References

2015 songs
Jeremih songs
Flo Rida songs
Songs written by Flo Rida
Songs written by Mick Schultz
Songs written by Jeremih
Def Jam Recordings singles